Parle Tilak Vidyalaya Marathi Medium Secondary School is a school situated in Vile Parle (East), a suburb of Mumbai, Maharashtra, India. The school was founded in 1921 by the Parle Tilak Vidyalaya Association, and is the oldest of the schools run by the organisation.

References

High schools and secondary schools in Mumbai
Memorials to Bal Gangadhar Tilak
Educational institutions established in 1921
1921 establishments in India